Amadou Cissé (born 23 October 1985) is a Guinean international footballer who last played for French side Aubervilliers.

Career 
Born in Conakry, Cissé began his career with GSI Pontivy and in 2002 was promoted to the first team who played in the Championnat de France Amateurs. In 2006, he moved to league rivals Aubervilliers, where he remained for two seasons. Cissé joined Czech Republic side Slavia Prague in July 2008. He played his first game in the UEFA Cup against AFC Ajax on 17 December 2008 and his first League game in the Gambrinus liga came on 23 February 2009 against FC Viktoria Plzeň. Following spells with Bohemians 1905 and 1. FC Slovácko, Cissé returned to Aubervilliers in the summer of 2011 and spent a further four seasons with the club.

In 2010, while playing for Bohemians, Cissé won two caps for the Guinea national football team, playing in friendly matches against Mali and Ethiopia.

References

External links
 Slavia Profile
 Idnes Profile

1985 births
Living people
Guinean Muslims
Guinean footballers
Sportspeople from Conakry
Association football defenders
GSI Pontivy players
FCM Aubervilliers players
SK Slavia Prague players
Bohemians 1905 players
1. FC Slovácko players
Czech First League players